The 14th César Awards ceremony, presented by the Académie des Arts et Techniques du Cinéma, honoured the best French films of 1988 and took place on 4 March 1989 at the Théâtre de l'Empire in Paris. The ceremony was chaired by Peter Ustinov and hosted by Pierre Tchernia. Camille Claudel won the award for Best Film.

Winners and nominees
The winners are highlighted in bold:

Best Film
 Camille Claudel, directed by Bruno Nuytten
 Le Grand bleu, directed by Luc BessonLa Lectrice, directed by Michel Deville
 L'Ours, directed by Jean-Jacques Annaud
 La Vie est un long fleuve tranquille, directed by Étienne Chatiliez

Best Foreign Film
 Out of Rosenheim, directed by Percy Adlon 
 Bird, directed by Clint Eastwood 
 Salaam Bombay!, directed by Mira Nair 
 Who Framed Roger Rabbit, directed by Robert Zemeckis

Best Debut
 La Vie est un long fleuve tranquille, directed by Étienne Chatiliez
 Camille Claudel directed by Bruno Nuytten
 Chocolat, directed by Claire Denis
 Drôle d'endroit pour une rencontre, directed by François Dupeyron

Best Actor
 Jean-Paul Belmondo, for Itinéraire d'un enfant gâté 
 Gérard Depardieu, for Camille Claudel 
 Jean-Marc Barr, for Le Grand bleu 
 Richard Anconina, for Itinéraire d'un enfant gâté 
 Daniel Auteuil, for Quelques jours avec moi

Best Actress
 Isabelle Adjani, for Camille Claudel
 Catherine Deneuve, for Drôle d'endroit pour une rencontre
 Miou-Miou, for La LectriceCharlotte Gainsbourg, for La Petite voleuse
 Isabelle Huppert, for Une affaire de femmes

Best Supporting Actor
 Patrick Chesnais, for La Lectrice
 Alain Cuny, for Camille Claudel
 Jean Reno, for Le Grand bleuJean-Pierre Marielle, for Quelques jours avec moi
 Patrick Bouchitey, for La Vie est un long fleuve tranquille

Best Supporting Actress
Hélène Vincent, for La vie est un long fleuve tranquille
María Casares, for La lectrice
Dominique Lavanant, for Quelques jours avec moi
Françoise Fabian, for Trois places pour le 26
Marie Trintignant, for Une affaire de femmes

Most Promising Actor
Stéphane Freiss, for Chouans!
Thomas Langmann, for Les années sandwiches
Laurent Grévill, for Camille Claudel
François Négret, for De bruit et de fureur

Most Promising Actress
Catherine Jacob, for La vie est un long fleuve tranquille
Nathalie Cardone, for Drôle d'endroit pour une rencontre
Clotilde de Bayser, for  L'enfance de l'art
Ingrid Held, for La maison assassinée

Best Director
Jean-Jacques Annaud, for L'ours
Luc Besson, for Le grand bleu
Michel Deville, for La lectrice
Claude Miller, for La petite voleuse
Claude Chabrol, for Une affaire de femmes

Best Writing
Étienne Chatiliez and Florence Quentin, for La vie est un long fleuve tranquille
François Dupeyron, for Drôle d'endroit pour une rencontre
Rosalinde Deville, Michel Deville, for La lectrice
Claude de Givray, Annie Miller, Claude Miller, François Truffaut, Luc Béraud, for La Petite voleuse

Best Cinematography
Pierre Lhomme, for Camille Claudel
Carlo Varini, for Le grand bleu
Philippe Rousselot, for L'ours

Best Costume Design
Dominique Borg, for Camille Claudel
Yvonne Sassinot de Nesle, for Chouans!
Elisabeth Tavernier, for La vie est un long fleuve tranquille

Best Sound
Pierre Befve, Gérard Lamps, François Groult, for Le grand bleu
Guillaume Sciama, Dominique Hennequin, François Groult, for Camille Claudel
Bernard Leroux, Claude Villand, Laurent Quaglio, for L'ours

Best Editing
Noëlle Boisson, for L'ours
Joëlle Hache, Jeanne Kef, for Camille Claudel
Raymonde Guyot, for La lectrice

Best Music
 Éric Serra, for Le Grand bleu
 Gabriel Yared, for Camille Claudel
 Francis Lai, for Itinéraire d'un enfant gâté

Best Production Design
 Bernard Vézat, for Camille Claudel
 Thierry Leproust, for La Lectrice
 Bernard Evein, for Trois places pour le 26

Best Animated Short
 L'Escalier chimérique, directed by Daniel Guyonnet
 "La Princesse des diamants", directed by Michel Ocelot
 Le Travail du fer, directed by Celia Canning, Néry Catineau

Best Fiction Short
 Lamento, directed by François Dupeyron
 Big Bang, directed by Eric Woreth
 New York 1935, directed by Michèle Ferrand-Lafaye
 Une femme pour l'hiver, directed by Manuel Flèche

Best Documentary Short
 Chet's Romance, directed by Bertrand Fèvre
 Classified People, directed by Yolande Zauberman
 Devant le mur, directed by Daisy Lamothe

Honorary César
 Bernard BlierPaul Grimault

See also
 61st Academy Awards
 42nd British Academy Film Awards

References

External links
 Official website
 
 14th César Awards at AlloCiné

1989
1989 film awards
Cesar